Change is Now: Renewing America's Promise is a compilation album released on April 28, 2009 through Hidden Beach Recordings in conjunction with the Presidential Inaugural Committee. The album includes previously released tracks from Wilco, Stevie Wonder, Death Cab for Cutie, and Common. An accompanying DVD features eight speeches by Barack Obama, starting with the campaign announcement in Springfield, Illinois and ending with the election night victory speech in Chicago. The album sold retail online and at inaugural events in Washington.

Track listing
"It's a New Day"* – will.i.am (4:00)
"The Dream is Real" – The Tony Rich Project (3:44)
"All About the Love Again"* – Stevie Wonder (5:34)
"Can't Stop" – Ozomatli (2:55)
"Peace Be Upon Us" – Sheryl Crow (4:22)
"There's Hope" – India.Arie (3:53)
"God is in the People"* – Melissa Etheridge (2:04)
"Change" – Lenny Kravitz (5:32)
"Dreamworld" – Robin Thicke (4:34)
"Pure Imagination" (2009 Version)* – Maroon 5 (4:29)
"Hush"* – Usher (3:17)
"Born for This" – BeBe Winans (5:26)
"What Light – Wilco (3:34)
"Shed a Little Light" – James Taylor (3:51)
"The Star-Spangled Banner" – Jennifer Hudson (3:08)
"Eternity "(David Foster Live Strings Mix)* – Lionel Richie (4:55)
"Grapevine Fires" – Death Cab for Cutie (4:08)
"Changes" – Common (4:00)

Songs with an asterisk (*) indicates the presence of excerpts from Barack Obama speeches.

iTunes bonus tracks
"All About the Love Again" (New Mix) – Stevie Wonder (4:02)
"All About the Love Again" (video) – Stevie Wonder (3:55)

DVD track listing
"Announcement for President" – February 10, 2007 in Springfield, Illinois
"Iowa Jefferson Jackson Dinner" – November 10, 2007 in Des Moines, Iowa
"Iowa Caucus Victory Speech" – January 3, 2008 in Des Moines, Iowa
"New Hampshire Primary Speech" – January 8, 2008 in Nashua, New Hampshire
"A More Perfect Union" – March 18, 2008 in Philadelphia, Pennsylvania
"A World That Stands As One" – July 24, 2008 in Berlin, Germany
"The American Promise" – August 28, 2008 in Denver, Colorado
"Election Night Victory Speech" – November 4, 2008 in Chicago, Illinois

Personnel

John Aguto – assistant engineer
Ahmed AlHirmi 	– oud
Abdulla AlKhalifa – arranger, producer
Brett Allen – guitar technician
Paul Arbogast – trombone
India.Arie – producer
Jeff B. – keyboards
Bernie Barlow – backing vocals
Davis A. Barnett – viola
Courtney Blooding – project coordinator
Bill Bottrell – synthesizer, marimba
Doyle Bramhall II – electric guitar
Mark Browne – bass
Andre Burch – engineer
Branden Burch – keyboards, producer, drum programming, mixing
Cedric Caldwell – producer
Jesse Carmichael – keyboards
Clifford Carter – synthesizer, synthesizer programming
Dru Castro – engineer
Ray Chew – arranger, conductor, producer
Eliza Cho – violin
James J. Cooper III – cello
Sheryl Crow – acoustic guitar, vocals
Vidal Davis – producer, vocal producer
Kevin Dean – assistant engineer
Pilar Diaz – backing vocals, musician
Patrick Dillett – assistant engineer
Vincent Dilorenzo – engineer, mixing
Ametria Dock – backing vocals, vocal arrangement
TJ Doherty – engineer
Simon "Woodchuck" Durham – bass
Mike Elizondo – bass, drum programming, sampled guitar
Melissa Etheridge – guitar, vocals, producer
James Farber – engineer, mixing
Sam Farrar – drums, programming, producer, engineer, mixing
Angela Fisher – choir director
Gary Fly – assistant engineer
John Frye – mixing
Ronald B. Gillyard – voices, A&R, talent coordinator
Steven Girmant – production coordination
Tom Gloady – assistant engineer
Noah Goldstein – assistant
Berry Gordy Jr. – advisor, inspiration
Bonnie Greenberg – leader, A&R, talent coordinator
Gary "Sugar Foot" Greenberg – leader
Don Grolnick – organ, synthesizer, piano, producer
Kevin Hanson – guitar
Andre Harris – producer, vocal producer
Henry Hirsch – engineer
Jennifer Hudson – vocals
Femi Jiya – engineer, mixing
Chris Johnson – trumpet, drum programming
Jimmy Johnson – bass
Jamar Jones – string arrangements
Thornell Jones – production coordination
Padraic Kerin – engineer
Lenny Kravitz – producer, mixing
Emma Kummrow – violin}
Nathaniel Kunkel – assistant engineer
Jared Kvitka – assistant engineer
Matthew Boomer La Monica – assistant engineer
Michael Landau – electric guitar
James Landry – engineer, mixing
Adam Lesnick – French horn
Adam Levine – guitar, vocals
Fritz Lewak – percussion, drums
Robert C. Ludwig – mastering
Mickey Madden – bass
Bill Malina – engineer
Will Markwell – engineer
Maroon 5 – producer
Robert Martin – violin
Harvey Mason Jr. – vocal producer
Steve McKeever – producer, executive producer
Thierry Migeotte – mastering, vocal effect
Katherine Miller – assistant engineer
Lamar Mitchell – programming
Peter Nocella – viola
Jim O'Rourke – string arrangements
Marvin "Chanz" Parkman – keyboards
Ila Parvaz – production coordination
Jon Polk – leader
K.C. Porter – keyboards, musician
Aaron Prellwitz – assistant
Dave Reitzas – vocal engineer
Jacques Richmond – digital editing
Pamela Robinson – research, A&R, selection, talent coordinator
Erik Rostad – violin
Philip Sayce – guitar, backing vocals
Jim Scott – mixing
Ian Shea – assistant
Rob Skipworth – assistant
Beau Sorenson – assistant
Moses Staimez – guitar
Erik Steigen – A&R, talent coordinator
Igor Szwec – violin
Gregory Teperman – violin
Robin Thicke – vocals
Ryan Toby – vocal producer, choir arrangement
Cekoya Tolbert – backing vocals
Jeff Trott – electric guitar
Jochem van der Saag – synthesizer, programming, engineer, mixing, sound design
Carlos Vega – drums
Dale Voelker – art direction, design
Bruce Walker – A&R, project manager
Christopher Walla – producer, engineer
Rob Wanda – scratching
Charles Whitfield – coordination
Alain Whyte – bass, guitar
will.i.am – piano, drums, producer, engineer, Fender Rhodes, mixing
Monica Williams – intern
Lily Wilson – backing vocals
BeBe Winans – producer
Oprah Winfrey – executive producer
Stevie Wonder – arranger, producer
John Ziemski – assistant

References

External links
Change is Now CD official site
Hidden Beach's official press release for the album
The Inauguration of President Barack Obama and Vice President Joe Biden

2009 compilation albums
Barack Obama
Hidden Beach Recordings albums